Arthur Miller: Writer is a 2017 documentary film by Rebecca Miller about the American playwright of the same name. The film premiered at the 2017 Telluride Film Festival. After airing on HBO, it was nominated for an Emmy for Outstanding Arts & Culture Documentary at the 40th News and Documentary Emmy Awards.

References

External links
 
Arthur Miller: Writer at HBO

2017 films
2017 documentary films
HBO documentary films
Films directed by Rebecca Miller
Documentary films about playwrights
2010s English-language films
2010s American films